The National Capital Wing of the Civil Air Patrol (CAP) is the highest echelon of Civil Air Patrol in the district of Washington, D.C. The National Capital Wing consists of nearly 400 cadet and adult members at over 6 locations across the District of Columbia; the City of Alexandria, Arlington County and Fairfax County in Northern Virginia; and Prince Georges County, MD.

Mission
The National Capital Wing performs the three missions of the Civil Air Patrol: providing emergency services; offering cadet programs for youth; and providing aerospace education for both CAP members and the general public.

Emergency services
The Civil Air Patrol provides emergency services, which includes performing search and rescue and disaster relief missions; as well as assisting in humanitarian aid assignments. The CAP also provides Air Force support through conducting light transport, communications support, and low-altitude route surveys. The Civil Air Patrol can also offer support to counter-drug missions.

Cadet programs
The Civil Air Patrol offers a cadet program for youth aged 12 to 21, which includes aerospace education, leadership training, physical fitness and moral leadership.

Aerospace education
The Civil Air Patrol offers aerospace education for CAP members and the general public, including providing training to the members of CAP, and offering workshops for youth throughout the nation through schools and public aviation events.

Resources
As of 2012, the National Capitol Wing has 2 Cessna 172's and a Cessna 182. They have 13 Vehicles, mainly 9-10 seat vans split between the squadrons. They have 5 VHF/FM Repeaters and 61 VHF/FM stations, with 6 HF stations.

Organization

See also
Awards and decorations of the Civil Air Patrol
District of Columbia Air National Guard

References

External links
National Capitol Wing Civil Air Patrol official website

Wings of the Civil Air Patrol
Education in Washington, D.C.
Military in Washington, D.C.